Beleți-Negrești is a commune in Argeș County, Muntenia, Romania. It is composed of four villages: Beleți, Lențea, Negrești and Zgripcești (the commune centre).

References

Communes in Argeș County
Localities in Muntenia